Pholourie, also spelled phulourie or phoulourie, is a snack food of Indo-Caribbean origin that is commonly eaten in Trinidad and Tobago as well as  in Guyana, Suriname and other parts of the Caribbean. It consists of fried, spiced spilt pea and flour dough balls that are served with a chutney.

Overview
The dough is made up of flour, ground split peas, water, and spices. Depending on the recipe, green seasoning, garlic, pepper, turmeric, onions and/or cumin are used. Then dough balls the size of golf balls are formed and fried afterwards. The fried balls are usually served with a chutney to dip them in, usually tamarind or mango. They are also added to karhi.

Pholourie is a popular street food in Guyana and Trinidad and Tobago and widely available from food carts and takeaways. It is famous in Debe. The dish was brought to Guyana, Trinidad and Tobago, and Suriname by migrants from India. These Indians were recruited as indentured laborers after slavery had been abolished in the 19th century, and they brought their local recipes with them which they altered according to ingredients available in their new home. Over the decades, local taste slowly altered, leading to the Indian-based part of the Caribbean cuisine known today. Pholourie is widely connected to the Phagwah festival celebrated by Hindus.

In popular culture
One of Sundar Popo's most famous songs is "Pholourie Bina Chutney Kaise Bani" (transl. What is pholourie without the chutney?).

References 

Fast food
Trinidad and Tobago cuisine
Guyanese cuisine
Surinamese cuisine
Indo-Caribbean cuisine